In Our Space Hero Suits is the debut LP by Those Dancing Days. The album was released on 13 October 2008 by Wichita Recordings. Three years later, the band produced the full-length album, Daydreams & Nightmares.

Artwork 
The hand-drawn and hand-painted album cover art was created by group members Cissi Efraimsson and Rebecka Rolfart.

Track listing

Personnel
 Linnea Jönsson - Vocalist
 Mimmi Evrell - Bass
 Rebecka Rolfart - Guitar
 Cissi Efraimsson - Drums
 Lisa Pyk - Hammond Organ

External links
 http://www.thosedancingdays.com

References

Those Dancing Days albums
2008 debut albums
Wichita Recordings albums